Vyšný Kubín is a village and municipality in Dolný Kubín District in the Žilina Region of northern Slovakia.

Famous people
Margita Figuli, writer born in Vyšný Kubín
Pavol Országh Hviezdoslav, poet born in Vyšný Kubín

References

External links
  Vyšný Kubín village website (in Slovak)

Villages and municipalities in Dolný Kubín District